Platyptilia pygmaeana is a moth of the family Pterophoridae. It is known from Equatorial Guinea.

References

pygmaeana
Endemic fauna of Equatorial Guinea
Moths of Africa
Moths described in 1913